Slowly may refer to:
 Slowly (app), Hong Kongese delayed messaging application
 Slowly (album), by Ghost, 1994
 "Slowly" (song), by Webb Pierce, 1954

See also
 Slowly Slowly (disambiguation)